The Surveyor-General of the Ordnance was a subordinate of the Master-General of the Ordnance and a member of the Board of Ordnance, a British government body, from its constitution in 1597. Appointments to the post were made by the crown under Letters Patent. His duties were to examine the ordnance received to see that it was of good quality. He also came to be responsible for the mapping of fortifications and eventually of all Great Britain, through the Ordnance Survey, and it is this role that is generally associated with surveyor-generalship.

History
The post was for a time held with that of Chief Engineer, but after 1750 became a political office, with the holder changing with the government of the day.

The office was vacant at the time the Board of Ordnance was abolished in 1855, the last holder, Lauderdale Maule, having died of cholera in the Crimea. The War Office Act of 1870 revived the office, making the Surveyor-General responsible for all aspects of Army logistics. The office was filled until 1888, when it was abolished.

Surveyors-General of the Ordnance
5 February 1538: Henry Johnson
23 January 1549: Anthony Anthony
25 June 1565: Henry Iden
2 December 1568: Thomas Pynner
10 April 1570: vacant
13 April 1570: William Jurden
21 June 1595: William Partridge
21 June 1598: vacant
3 February 1599: John Davies (knighted 12 July 1599)
17 July 1602: John Linewray (knighted 10 July 1604)
11 June 1606: Joseph Earth
5 September 1609: Sir John Kaye
1 May 1624: Richard Kaye
28 November 1624: vacant
27 September 1625: Sir Alexander Brett
29 October 1627: vacant
3 December 1627: Sir Thomas Bludder
8 April 1628: Sir Paul Harris (succeeded as 2nd Baronet January 1629)
Interregnum; post occupied by:
George Payler, March 1643 to December 1658
Elia Palmer, in 1660
22 June 1660: Francis Nicholls
28 July 1669 (or before): vacant
13 November 1669: Jonas Moore I (knighted 28 January 1673)
25 August 1679: Jonas Moore II (II) (knighted 9 August 1680)
13 July 1682: vacant
29 July 1682: Sir Bernard de Gomme
23 November 1685: vacant
2 December 1685: Sir Henry Sheer
19 July 1689: John Charlton
29 June 1702: William Bridges
30 October 1714: vacant
2 December 1714: Michael Richards
5 February 1722: vacant
10 February 1722: John Armstrong
25 April 1742: vacant
30 April 1742: Thomas Lascelles
10 April 1750: Charles Frederick
February 1770: Thomas Desaguliers
13 May 1782: The Hon. Thomas Pelham
20 May 1783: John Courtenay
22 May 1784: The Hon. James Luttrell
23 December 1788: vacant
20 April 1789: The Hon. George Cranfield Berkeley
10 July 1795: Alexander Ross
22 November 1804: James Murray Hadden
20 July 1810: Robert Moorsom (knighted 2 January 1815)
16 March 1820: Sir Ulysses Bagenal Burgh (succeeded as 2nd Baron Downes 3 March 1826)
18 May 1827: Sir Edward William Campbell Rich Owen
1 April 1828: Sir Herbert Taylor
16 April 1829: Sir Henry Fane
15 January 1831: William Leader Maberly
4 December 1832: Charles Richard Fox
30 December 1834: Lord Edward Somerset
25 April 1835: Sir Rufane Shaw Donkin
1 May 1841: vacant
11 May 1841: Charles Richard Fox
13 September 1841: Jonathan Peel
14 July 1846: Charles Richard Fox
3 July 1852: Sir George Henry Frederick Berkeley
18 January 1853: The Hon. Lauderdale Maule
1 August 1854: vacant; duties performed by the Lieutenant-General of the Ordnance, Sir Hew Dalrymple Ross
6 June 1855: abolished
5 August 1870: Sir Henry Storks
26 February 1874: Lord Eustace Cecil
1 June 1880: Sir John Miller Adye
17 January 1882: Henry Robert Brand
27 June 1885: Guy Dawnay
6 February 1886: William Woodall
4 August 1886: Sir Henry Northcote

The office was abolished in 1888.

References
http://www.history.ac.uk/publications/office/ordnance-surveyor

Senior appointments of the British Army
War Office
History of the British Army